Michael Joseph Morrissey (May 5, 1876 – February 22, 1939), known as Frank and nicknamed "Deacon," was a pitcher in Major League Baseball in the early twentieth century. Morrissey appeared in a total of six games as a pitcher in 1901 and 1902, five of which were as a member of the Chicago Orphans. He compiled a 1–3 record with fourteen strikeouts in his six appearances. The Orphans also used him as a third baseman in two games in 1902.

External links 

1876 births
1939 deaths
Baseball players from Baltimore
Major League Baseball pitchers
Boston Americans players
Chicago Orphans players
Petersburg Farmers players
Hampton Clamdiggers players
Dayton Old Soldiers players
Manchester Manchesters players
Newport Colts players
Portsmouth Boers players
Norfolk Skippers players
Portsmouth Browns players
Raleigh Senators players
Lawrence Colts players
New Bedford Whalers (baseball) players
Roanoke Tigers players
Danville Red Sox players
Richmond Colts players
Greensboro Patriots players